Muhammad Hasbi is an Indonesian weightlifter. He competed at the 2012 Summer Olympics in the Men's 62 kg, and will also be competing in the 2016 Summer Olympics in the same category.

References

Indonesian male weightlifters
Living people
Olympic weightlifters of Indonesia
Weightlifters at the 2012 Summer Olympics
Weightlifters at the 2016 Summer Olympics
Weightlifters at the 2014 Asian Games
Sportspeople from Jakarta
1992 births
Southeast Asian Games silver medalists for Indonesia
Southeast Asian Games medalists in weightlifting
Competitors at the 2011 Southeast Asian Games
Asian Games competitors for Indonesia
21st-century Indonesian people